Geikielite is a magnesium titanium oxide mineral with formula: MgTiO3. It is a member of the ilmenite group. It crystallizes in the trigonal system forming typically opaque, black to reddish black crystals.

It was first described in 1892 for an occurrence in the Ceylonese gem bearing gravel placers. It was named for Scottish geologist Sir Archibald Geikie (1835–1924). It occurs in metamorphosed impure magnesian limestones, in serpentinite derived from ultramafic rocks, in kimberlites and carbonatites.  Associated minerals include rutile, spinel, clinohumite, perovskite, diopside, serpentine, forsterite, brucite, hydrotalcite, chlorite and calcite.

References

Further reading

Oxide minerals
Trigonal minerals
Minerals in space group 148

titanium minerals